is a Japanese song incorporating the tune of Scottish folk song Auld Lang Syne with completely different lyrics by Chikai Inagaki, first introduced in a collection of singing songs for elementary school students in 1881 (Meiji 14). The swapping of lyrics without substantial change to the music is known as contrafactum. The words describe a series of images of hardships that the industrious student endures in his relentless quest for knowledge, starting with the firefly’s light, which the student uses to keep studying when he has no other light sources. It is commonly heard during graduation ceremonies and at the end of the school day. Many stores and restaurants play it to usher customers out at the end of a business day. On the very popular Japanese New Year's Eve TV show, NHK's Kōhaku Uta Gassen, it has become a tradition for all the performers to sing Hotaru no Hikari as the last song. Tokyo Disneyland and Tokyo Disney Sea here is Tokyo Disney Resort for Countdown Party's from New Year's Eve Park show, "New Day, New Dream". Another song from the same period and used at graduation ceremonies thought to be based on a Scottish folk song is "Aogeba Tōtoshi".

Lyrics

References
 Hotaru no Hikari - Everything2

Graduation songs
Japanese songs
Japanese-language songs
New Year in Japan